The 2017 Rally Mexico (formally known as the Rally Guanajuato Mexico 2017) was a motor racing event for rally cars that was held over four days between 9 and 12 March 2017. Kris Meeke and Paul Nagle from Citroën Total Abu Dhabi WRT won the rally.

Entry list

Classification

Event standings

Special stages

Power Stage 
The Power Stage was a  stage at the end of the rally.

Championship standings after the rally

Drivers' Championship standings

Manufacturers' Championship standings

References

External links
 The official website of the World Rally Championship

2017 in Mexican motorsport
2017 World Rally Championship season
March 2017 sports events in Mexico
2017 Rally Mexico